Lee Do-hui (born July 15, 1971) is a South Korean sprint canoer who competed in the late 1980s. At the 1988 Summer Olympics in Seoul, she was eliminated in the repechages of the K-2 500 m event while being eliminated in the semifinals of the K-4 500 m event.

External links
Sports-reference.com profile

1971 births
Canoeists at the 1988 Summer Olympics
Living people
Olympic canoeists of South Korea
South Korean female canoeists